Jaeyaksan is a mountain of South Korea. It has an elevation of 1,108 metres. It is part of the Yeongnam Alps mountain range.

See also
List of mountains of Korea

References

External links
 Official website for the Yeongnam Alps

Mountains of South Korea
Mountains of Ulsan
One-thousanders of South Korea